Shyla Stylez (September 23, 1982 – November 9, 2017) was a Canadian pornographic actress.

Career 

Shyla Stylez became interested in entering the pornography industry in her teens, and later moved to Vancouver where she worked as both a stripper and a webcam model, and appeared in nude pictorials in adult magazines such as Hustler and  Swank. In her off-time, she would contact studios by email and phone to find out how to appear in films. She received her first AVN Award nomination as Best New Starlet in 2003.

Stylez was involved in a sex scandal with former Orange County assistant-sheriff George Jaramillo, where she was noted as having had several sexual encounters with him.

Stylez signed on as exclusive contract performer for Jill Kelly Productions and later married its CEO, Bob Friedland, on October 25, 2002. The couple divorced in August 2003, but Friedland held Stylez to her contract, making it impossible for her to shoot hardcore scenes for anyone else. In September 2004, she met Michael Whiteacre, who cast her in a series of softcore late-night films in 2004 and 2005. In August 2005, Jill Kelly Productions filed for bankruptcy.

Stylez was nominated at the 2009 XRCO Awards for the Best Comeback. Stylez hosted the Los Angeles independent TV show Un-Wired TV in 2007.

In 2008, she was nominated for more AVN Awards, including Best Supporting Actress, for Best Tease Performance, and for her performances in My Plaything: Shyla Stylez and Pirates II. In 2010, she was named by Maxim as one of the 12 top female stars in porn. Shyla Stylez was inducted into the Halls of Fame of the Urban X Awards and the AVN in 2011 and 2016, respectively.

Death 
On November 9, 2017, Stylez was found unresponsive in her bed at her mother's house in Armstrong. She was pronounced dead shortly after, aged 35.

Awards and nominations 
2003 AVN Award nominee – Best New Starlet
2007 XRCO Award nominee – Best Cumback
2007 AVN Award nominee – Best All-Girl Sex Scene, Video – Girlvana 2, Zero Tolerance Entertainment with Sammie Rhodes and Jenaveve Jolie
2008 AVN Award nominee – Best Supporting Actress, Video – Coming Home, Wicked Pictures
2008 AVN Award nominee – Best Interactive DVD – My Plaything: Shyla Stylez, Digital Sin
2009 AVN Award nominee – Best Tease Performance – Curvy Girls
2009 AVN Award nominee – Best POV Sex Scene – Full Streams Ahead
2009 AVN Award nominee – Best Group Sex Scene – Pirates II
2010 AVN Award nominee – Best POV Sex Scene – Jack's POV 12
2011 Urban X Awards Hall of Fame
2016 AVN Hall of Fame

References

External links 

 
 
 

1982 births
2017 deaths
Canadian female adult models
Canadian people of German descent
Canadian pornographic film actresses
People from the Regional District of North Okanagan